Khingan is the Mongolian name for the mountains divided into the:

 Greater Khingan, volcanic mountain range in Inner Mongolia, China 
 Lesser Khingan, mountain range in the northeastern section  of Heilongjiang, China
 Outer Khingan, also known as the Stanovoy Range; mountain range located in southeastern parts of the Russian Far East

In Mongolian contexts, it may also refer to:
 Hinggan (disambiguation), from the Manchu form of the same name
 Xing'an (disambiguation), from the Chinese form of the same name